Biological organisation is the hierarchy of complex biological structures and systems that define life using a reductionistic approach. The traditional hierarchy, as detailed below, extends from atoms to biospheres. The higher levels of this scheme are often referred to as an ecological organisation concept, or as the field,  hierarchical ecology.

Each level in the hierarchy represents an increase in organisational complexity, with each "object" being primarily composed of the previous level's basic unit. The basic principle behind the organisation is the concept of emergence—the properties and functions found at a hierarchical level are not present and irrelevant at the lower levels.

The biological organisation of life is a fundamental premise for numerous areas of scientific research, particularly in the medical sciences. Without this necessary degree of organisation, it would be much more difficult—and likely impossible—to apply the study of the effects of various physical and chemical phenomena to diseases and physiology (body function). For example, fields such as cognitive and behavioral neuroscience could not exist if the brain was not composed of specific types of cells, and the basic concepts of pharmacology could not exist if it was not known that a change at the cellular level can affect an entire organism. These applications extend into the ecological levels as well. For example, DDT's direct insecticidal effect occurs at the subcellular level, but affects higher levels up to and including multiple ecosystems. Theoretically, a change in one atom could change the entire biosphere.

Levels

The simple standard biological organisation scheme, from the lowest level to the highest level, is as follows:

More complex schemes incorporate many more levels. For example, a molecule can be viewed as a grouping of elements, and an atom can be further divided into subatomic particles (these levels are outside the scope of biological organisation). Each level can also be broken down into its own hierarchy, and specific types of these biological objects can have their own hierarchical scheme. For example, genomes can be further subdivided into a hierarchy of genes.

Each level in the hierarchy can be described by its lower levels. For example, the organism may be described at any of its component levels, including the atomic, molecular, cellular, histological (tissue), organ and organ system levels. Furthermore, at every level of the hierarchy, new functions necessary for the control of life appear. These new roles are not functions that the lower level components are capable of and are thus referred to as emergent properties.

Every organism is organised, though not necessarily to the same degree. An organism can not be organised at the histological (tissue) level if it is not composed of tissues in the first place.

Emergence of biological organisation
Biological organisation is thought to have emerged in the early RNA world when RNA chains began to express the basic conditions necessary for natural selection to operate as conceived by Darwin: heritability, variation of type, and competition for limited resources. Fitness of an RNA replicator (its per capita rate of increase) would likely have been a function of adaptive capacities that were intrinsic (in the sense that they were determined by the nucleotide sequence) and the availability of resources. The three primary adaptive capacities may have been (1) the capacity to replicate with moderate fidelity (giving rise to both heritability and variation of type); (2) the capacity to avoid decay; and (3) the capacity to acquire and process resources. These capacities would have been determined initially by the folded configurations of the RNA replicators (see “Ribozyme”) that, in turn, would be encoded in their individual nucleotide sequences. Competitive success among different RNA replicators would have depended on the relative values of these adaptive capacities. Subsequently, among more recent organisms competitive success at successive levels of biological organisation, presumably continued to depend, in a broad sense, on the relative values of these adaptive capacities.

Fundamentals 
Empirically, a large proportion of the (complex) biological systems we observe in nature exhibit hierarchical structure. On theoretical grounds we could expect complex systems to be hierarchies in a world in which complexity had to evolve from simplicity. System hierarchies analysis performed in the 1950s, laid the empirical foundations for a field that would be, from the 1980s, hierarchical ecology.

The theoretical foundations are summarized by thermodynamics.
When biological systems are modeled as physical systems, in its most general abstraction, they are thermodynamic open systems that exhibit self-organised behavior, and the set/subset relations between dissipative structures can be characterized in a hierarchy.

A simpler and more direct way to explain the fundamentals of the "hierarchical organisation of life", was introduced in Ecology by Odum and others as the "Simon's hierarchical principle"; Simon emphasized that hierarchy "emerges almost inevitably through a wide variety of evolutionary processes, for the simple reason that hierarchical structures are stable".

To motivate this deep idea, he offered his "parable" about imaginary watchmakers.

{|
!Parable of the Watchmakers
|-
|
There once were two watchmakers, named Hora and Tempus, who made very fine watches. The phones in their workshops rang frequently; new customers were constantly calling them. However, Hora prospered while Tempus became poorer and poorer. In the end, Tempus lost his shop. What was the reason behind this?

The watches consisted of about 1000 parts each. The watches that Tempus made were designed such that, when he had to put down a partly assembled watch (for instance, to answer the phone), it immediately fell into pieces and had to be reassembled from the basic elements.

Hora had designed his watches so that he could put together subassemblies of about ten components each. Ten of these subassemblies could be put together to make a larger sub-assembly. Finally, ten of the larger subassemblies constituted the whole watch. Each subassembly could be put down without falling apart.
|}

See also

 Abiogenesis
 Cell theory
 Cellular differentiation
 Composition of the human body
 Evolution of biological complexity
 Evolutionary biology
 Gaia hypothesis
 Hierarchy theory
 Holon (philosophy)
 Human ecology
 Level of analysis
 Living systems
 Noogenesis
 Self-organization
 Spontaneous order
 Structuralism (biology)
 Timeline of the evolutionary history of life

Notes

References

External links

 2011's theoretical/mathematical discussion.

Life
Articles containing video clips
Biology
Hierarchy
Emergence
Levels of organization (Biology)